Italian submarine Durbo was an  built for the Royal Italian Navy (Regia Marina) during the 1930s. It was named after a town of Durba in Ethiopia.

Design and description
The Adua-class submarines were essentially repeats of the preceding . They displaced  surfaced and  submerged.

For surface running, the boats were powered by two  diesel engines, each driving one propeller shaft. When submerged each propeller was driven by a  electric motor. They could reach  on the surface and  underwater.

The boats were armed with six internal  torpedo tubes, four in the bow and two in the stern. They were also armed with one  deck gun for combat on the surface. The light anti-aircraft armament consisted of one or two pairs of   machine guns.

Construction and career
Durbo was launched on 6 March 1938 in OTO's shipyard in La Spezia and commissioned on 1 July of the same year. 
In August 1938 she was assigned to Leros. Durbo spent about a year engaged in exercises between Rhodes and Leros before returning to Italy.

Durbo, under command of captain Armando Acanfora, with her sisters  and  formed 35th Squadron (III Submarine Group) based in Messina. On June 9, 1940, she left the base for an offensive mission in the Gulf of Hammamet.

On June 16, 1940, at 6:10, at the point  (in the Gulf of Hammamet about 44 miles southwest of Pantelleria), while proceeding to her patrol area, Durbo launched a couple of torpedoes at a small unit (perhaps a corvette, or a French destroyer), hearing a violent detonation after two minutes, but the rough seas made it impossible to verify whether the ship had been hit. There is no information about any ships being damaged or sunk in this area on this date.

For the next several months Durbo went on several more patrols around Malta and Pantelleria but without any success.
 
On October 9, 1940, Durbo, still under command of captain Acanfora, sailed from Messina to her newly assigned area of operations, about seventy miles East of Gibraltar. On October 12, 1940, she reached her assigned area near the island of Alboran south of Málaga and commenced patrolling in anticipation of a British convoy that she was supposed to report on. Durbo patrolled the area until October 18, and sighted several ships, including a British destroyer on October 17, but didn't attack any of the sighted targets.

In the early morning of October 18, while on the surface, captain Acanfora learned that the submarine had developed an oil leak, and ordered the crew to fix the problem as quickly as possible. At 17:25 a Saro London flying boat of 202 Squadron RAF, piloted by Captain Percy R. Hatfield, sighted air bubbles and a small patch of oil while flying off the island of Alboran, 65 miles East of the Strait of Gibraltar. Durbo just detected a ship, and rose up to periscope depth to observe her potential target. Around 17:50 together with a second 202 Squadron London, piloted by Captain Norman F. Eagleton, Hatfield dropped bombs at the location of the bubbles and the oil. After a lookout on  had observed the reconnaissance planes dive and release bombs, both ships rushed in to close in on the area of attack, and soon established a contact on ASDIC. The pressure strained the steel plates which increased oil leak, making the submarine's position even more visible to destroyers. The submarine dove down, and another depth charge attack followed. After about 50 depth charges were dropped by both destroyers, at around 19:30, the submarine surfaced again, and was immediately fired upon by both destroyers. One shell hit the conning tower, forcing the crew to start abandoning the boat.

They got down into control room, and managed to grab codes and operational orders which were not destroyed. The capture of secret documents had a fatal short-term outcome: they shown the location of other Italian submarines, and just two days later, on October 20, 1940, a group of British destroyers would set a trap to  whose location was revealed by the captured documents.  was sunk after a hard chase, leaving only nine survivors.

Notes

References
 

 
 

Adua-class submarines
World War II submarines of Italy
Lost submarines of Italy
Maritime incidents in October 1940
World War II shipwrecks in the Mediterranean Sea
1938 ships
Ships built by OTO Melara
Ships built in La Spezia
Submarines sunk by British warships